The 1990 LPGA Championship was the 36th LPGA Championship, played July 26–29 at Bethesda Country Club in Bethesda, Maryland, a suburb northwest of Washington, D.C.

Five strokes back, Beth Daniel shot a final round 66 (−5) for 280 (−4) to win her sole major title, a stroke ahead of runner-up Rosie Jones, the third round leader.

This was the first of four consecutive LPGA Championships at Bethesda Country Club. The purse (and winner's share) were doubled this year to $1 million and $150,000, respectively, the largest in LPGA Tour history. The LPGA Championship was the tour's richest major from this year through 1995.

Past champions in the field

Made the cut

Source:

Missed the cut

Source:

Final leaderboard
Sunday, July 29, 1990

Source:

References

External links
Bethesda Country Club

Women's PGA Championship
Golf in Maryland
LPGA Championship
LPGA Championship
LPGA Championship
LPGA Championship
Women's sports in Maryland